Hisamodien Mohamed (2 January 1965 – 24 August 2020) was a South African politician and advocate who served as a Member of the National Assembly of South Africa for the African National Congress from May 2019 until August 2020. Prior to serving in Parliament, Mohamed was the provincial head of the Department of Justice and Constitutional Development.

Early life and education
Mohamed was born on 2 January 1965 in Lotus River in Cape Town and attended Wittebome High School. He joined the United Democratic Front as a high school student in 1985. He went on to study law at the University of Western Cape and obtained three degrees. Mohamed also completed a senior executive management course at Harvard Business School in 2001.

Career
In 1990, Mohamed was appointed as a temporary attorney at the Athlone Magistrate's Court. Between 1993 and 1994, he was a public prosecutor at the Mitchells Plain Magistrate's Court. He was admitted as an advocate in the office of the family advocate in 1995. Mohamed was the provincial head of the Department of Justice and Constitutional Development between 1997 and 2019.

He was the first chairperson of the African National Congress in the southern suburbs of Cape Town. From 1995 to 2018, he served on the provincial executive committee of the party.

Parliamentary career
In May 2019, Mohamed was elected to the National Assembly of South Africa as a member of the ANC. His constituency area was Grassy Park. He served as a party whip on the Portfolio Committee on Justice and Correctional Services.

Death
Mohamed died of a heart attack on 24 August 2020 in his home in Pinelands, Cape Town. He was 55 years old and had a wife and three children. The Portfolio Committee on Justice and Correctional Services and the ANC sent their condolences.

References

External links

Adv. Hishaam Mohamed at University of the Western Cape

1965 births
2020 deaths
People from Cape Town
Coloured South African people
University of the Western Cape alumni
African National Congress politicians
Members of the National Assembly of South Africa
20th-century South African politicians
21st-century South African politicians